Hartmut Mehdorn (born 31 July 1942 in Warsaw) is a German manager and mechanical engineer. Until May 2009 he served as CEO of Deutsche Bahn AG, Germany's biggest railway company. He served as CEO of Germany's second largest airline Air Berlin until he stepped down in January 2013.  In March 2013 he assumed a CEO position at Flughafen Berlin Brandenburg GmbH (FBB), the owner and future operator of Berlin Brandenburg Airport, until March 2015.

Education
After studying mechanical engineering at Technical University of Berlin, he joined the construction development section of Focke-Wulf in Bremen.

Career
From 1966 to 1978, Mehdorn worked for what later became known as the "Vereinigte Flugtechnische Werke-Fokker GmbH", his last position being that of production head at the "Nordwerke" of MBB (Messerschmitt-Bölkow-Blohm). From 1979 to 1984, he was a member of the management of Airbus Industrie S.A. in Toulouse, France, where he was responsible for production, purchasing, and quality assurance. Between 1984 and 1989, Mehdorn was head of the 'MBB Transport- und Verkehrsflugzeuge' group in Hamburg and from 1985 was also a member of the MBB management team in Munich.

From 1989 to 1992, Mehdorn had a joint function as chairman of Deutsche Airbus GmbH in Hamburg and, from 1992 to 1995, he was a member of the board of Deutsche Aerospace AG in Munich where he was responsible for the aviation corporate division. He was then chairman of the board of Heidelberger Druckmaschinen AG from 1997 to 1999, and, from 1998 to 1999, was also a member of the board of RWE where he was responsible for industrial holdings.

Hartmut Mehdorn was CEO and Chairman of the Board of Management of Deutsche Bahn AG in Berlin from the end of 1999 until he offered his resignation to the supervisory board on March 30, 2009.

In September 2011 he took over the position of CEO at Germany's second largest airline Air Berlin, where he had already been on the Board of non-executive directors for almost two years.

Personal details
Mehdorn is married to Frenchwoman Hélène Mehdorn (née Vuillequez) and has three grown-up children, two sons and a daughter. He said in an interview that he speaks English with his wife because they did not know each other's languages when they met and fell in love during Mehdorn's assignment in Toulouse. His wife speaks French with the children and he speaks German with them. Mehdorn was on the board of Stiftung Lesen. He received the Order of Merit of the Federal Republic of Germany in 1982 for his work with Airbus. Mehdorn also became a Commander of the French Legion of Honour in 2004.

References

External links 

1942 births
Living people
Engineers from Warsaw
Air Berlin
Deutsche Bahn people
German businesspeople in transport
Engineers from Bremen (state)
Businesspeople from Berlin
German airline chief executives
Recipients of the Cross of the Order of Merit of the Federal Republic of Germany